BJ or B. J. may refer to:

Businesses and organizations
 BJ Services Company, an oil and gas equipment and services company that is now a subsidiary of Baker Hughes
 BJ's Restaurant & Brewery, an American restaurant chain
 BJ's Wholesale Club, an American membership-only warehouse club chain
 B. J. Medical College, Pune, India
 Ben & Jerry's, an ice cream company
 Bergslagernas Järnvägar, a private railroad company of Sweden
 Toronto Blue Jays, a professional baseball team
 Booster Juice, a Canadian chain of juice and smoothie bars
 Nouvelair (IATA airline code)

People
 B. J. (given name), people with the given name
 Boris Johnson (born 1964), British prime minister
Billy Joel, American singer-songwriter and pianist

Fictional characters
 B.J., a dinosaur character from the children's television program Barney & Friends
 BJ Birdie, former mascot for the Toronto Blue Jays baseball team
 B. J. Hunnicutt, a fictional doctor on the TV show M*A*S*H
 B. J. Jones, a character on the ABC soap opera General Hospital
 BJ Smith, a character in the video game Grand Theft Auto: Vice City
 B.J. Walker, a character on the American soap opera Santa Barbara
 William "B.J." Blazkowicz, the protagonist of the video game series Wolfenstein
 Billy Joe "B. J." McKay, the protagonist of the TV show B. J. and the Bear

Places
 Beijing, China (Guobiao abbreviation BJ)
 Benin, WMO and ISO 2-letter country code
 .bj, domain name ccTLD for Benin
 Burton Joyce, a village in Nottinghamshire

Sport and competition
 Back Judge, an official in American football
 Beitar Jerusalem F.C., an Israeli football club
 Bj league, a Japanese professional basketball league
 Blackjack, a casino card game

Other uses
 Bachelor of Journalism, an academic degree
 Broadcast jockey, the Korean term for a streamer
 Beijing (locomotive)
 Biochemical Journal
 Blow job, sexual slang for fellatio
 Ball joint, a part found in automobile suspension
 Bubble Jet, a Canon Inc. printer trademark